Matteo Mulas (born 16 March 1992) is an Italian rower who won a silver medal at the 2018 World Championships in Plovdiv, Bulgaria.

Championships
World Rowing Championships
Chungju 2013: bronze medal LM4x.  
Plovdiv 2018: silver medal LM4x.

European Rowing Championships
Glasgow 2018: gold medal

References

External links
 

1992 births
Living people
Italian male rowers
World Rowing Championships medalists for Italy